Aaron Morgan (born 21 November 1978) is an Australian former rugby league footballer who played for the North Queensland Cowboys in the National Rugby League.

Playing career
A Bowen Tigers junior, Morgan was signed by the North Queensland Cowboys for the 2003 season after playing for the Wests Panthers in the Queensland Cup.

In Round 15 of the 2003 NRL season, he made his NRL debut in the Cowboys' 22–24 loss to the Parramatta Eels, starting on the wing and scoring a try. Three weeks later, he made his second and final NRL appearance in the Cowboys' 16–22 loss to the Melbourne Storm, once again starting on the wing and scoring a try.

In 2004, Morgan spent the entire season playing for the North Queensland Young Guns in the Queensland Cup. In 2005, he joined the Norths Devils, playing three seasons for them before retiring at the end of the 2008 season.

In 2015, he was named on the wing in the Wests Panthers Team of the 2000s by rugby league historian Mike Higginson.

Statistics

NRL
 Statistics are correct to the end of the 2003 season

References

1978 births
Living people
Australian rugby league players
North Queensland Cowboys players
Norths Devils players
Rugby league wingers
Rugby league players from Queensland
Wests Panthers players